John Hou Sæter (born 13 January 1998), also known by his Chinese name Hou Yongyong, is a professional footballer who plays as a midfielder for Norwegian First Division club Ranheim. Sæter has represented Norway at several youth levels; however, he was naturalized as a Chinese citizen in 2019.

Club career

Early career
John Hou Sæter started his football career when he joined Rosenborg's youth academy in 2013. He made his debut for the club on 24 April 2014 in a 3–0 win against Orkla FK in the 2014 Norwegian Football Cup, becoming the youngest player ever to make his debut for Rosenborg aged 16 years and 101 days. He made his league debut on 28 September 2014 in a 3–0 win against Aalesund, coming on as a substitute in the 81st minute. He became the youngest player ever to make his league debut for the club aged 16 years and 258 days.

In August 2016, Hou Sæter signed a new two-year contract with Rosenborg before being loaned to Norwegian First Division side Ranheim until the end of the 2016 season. In July 2017, Hou Sæter transferred to fellow Tippeligaen side Stabæk.

Beijing Guoan
In January 2019, Hou Sæter gained Chinese citizenship and transferred to Chinese Super League side Beijing Guoan. He made his debut for the club on 23 February 2019 in a 2–0 loss against Shanghai SIPG in the 2019 Chinese FA Super Cup, coming on as a substitute for Chi Zhongguo in the 71st minute. This made Hou Sæter the first naturalized player in the professional Chinese leagues.

Hou Sæter left the team at the end of 2022 and returned to Ranheim after his contract with Guoan ended.

Personal life
Born to a Norwegian father and a Chinese mother from Luoyang, Henan, Hou Sæter's Chinese name is Hou Yongyong. 

When Hou Sæter was 10 years old, he participated in an international football competition arranged by Manchester United. He was chosen as one of 37 from a group of about 20,000 participants to come attend the finale in Manchester. He finished second in the competition and received an award from Bobby Charlton, only beaten by a boy who was a year older than him.

Career statistics
.

Honours
Rosenborg
Tippeligaen: 2015
Norwegian Football Cup: 2015

See also
List of Chinese naturalized footballers

References

External links
Profile at RBK.no (archived 21 February 2015)

1998 births
Living people
Footballers from Trondheim
Sportspeople from Henan
Sportspeople of Chinese descent
Norwegian footballers
Norway youth international footballers
China youth international footballers
Chinese footballers
Norwegian people of Chinese descent
Chinese people of Norwegian descent
Naturalized citizens of the People's Republic of China
Norwegian expatriate sportspeople in China
Rosenborg BK players
Eliteserien players
Ranheim Fotball players
Stabæk Fotball players
Beijing Guoan F.C. players
Norwegian First Division players
Chinese Super League players
Association football midfielders